Janq'u Pukara (Aymara janq'u white, pukara fortress, "white fortress", also spelled Janko Pukara) is a mountain in the Bolivian Andes which reaches a height of approximately . It is located in the Cochabamba Department, Tapacari Province. Janq'u Pukara lies northwest of Ñuñu Qullu.

References 

Mountains of Cochabamba Department